Little Stranger is the debut studio (and only) album by New Zealand recording artist Annah Mac. It was released in New Zealand on 5 September 2011.

It peaked at #32 on the RIANZ Albums chart, and at #7 on the RIANZ New Zealand Artists Albums chart.

Recording and production
The majority of the album was recorded at Roundhead Studios, with American producer Brady Blade; working with Josh Fountain to record and remix Girl In Stilettos at Woodcut Studios. Bucket was produced by Mac and Fountain at York Street Studios, while Celia was produced by Wayne Bell and Ben King at 'The Lab'.

Singles
 Home was released as Annah Mac's debut single before the Little Stranger era; but is included on the album.
 Focus was released as Annah Mac's second single before the Little Stranger era; and is also included on the album.
 Baby Don't Change was released as Annah Mac's third single before the Little Stranger era; and is also included on the album.
 Celia was released as Annah Mac's fourth single, and is the first of the Little Stranger era. It is included on the album.
 Girl In Stilettos is Annah Mac's fifth single, and is the second of the Little Stranger era. It is Annah Mac's most popular single to date, and is included on the album. It peaked at #2 on the RIANZ singles chart, and at #1 on the RIANZ New Zealand Artists singles chart.
 Bucket was released as Annah Mac's sixth single, and is to be released as part of the deluxe edition of Little Stranger.

Deluxe edition
In and interview with New Zealand radio station The Edge, Annah Mac said that she is looking at releasing a deluxe edition of the album Little Stranger in early 2013. It would contain the single Bucket, which was released on 14 September 2012, the deluxe edition was pulled for reasons unknown and remains unreleased.

Track listing

The Girl In Stilettos Tour

The Girl In Stilettos Tour was the first concert tour by New Zealand musician Annah Mac, in support of her first studio album Little Stranger.

Dates and venues

Charts

References

2011 debut albums
Annah Mac albums
Albums recorded at Roundhead Studios